"The Die Is Cast" is the 67th episode of the television series Star Trek: Deep Space Nine, the 21st episode of the third season. It is the second half of a two-part episode, concluding the story begun in the previous episode, "Improbable Cause". This episode was first televised in broadcast syndication in May 1995.

Set in the 24th century, the series follows the adventures of the crew of the space station Deep Space Nine, adjacent to a wormhole connecting the Alpha and Gamma Quadrants of the galaxy. The Gamma Quadrant is home to a hostile empire known as the Dominion, whose Founders are the shapeshifting Changelings.

In the previous episode, Deep Space Nine's security chief Odo, a Changeling with no allegiance to the Dominion, discovered a planned surprise attack against the Dominion by the intelligence agencies of two Alpha Quadrant empires, the Romulan Tal Shiar and the Cardassian Obsidian Order. In this episode, the exiled former Obsidian Order agent Garak has to interrogate Odo to prove his loyalty to his former mentor, as the Tal Shiar and Obsidian Order begin their ill-fated attack on the Founders.

Plot
Garak and Odo have not been heard from on Deep Space Nine in several days, following their departure in a runabout to investigate an attempt on Garak's life. The crew of Deep Space Nine is alarmed when a large Cardassian–Romulan fleet suddenly decloaks and flies through the wormhole to the Gamma Quadrant. The fleet, under the command of Cardassian Enabran Tain and Romulan Colonel Lovok, aims to destroy the homeworld of the Founders of the Dominion. Tain has offered Garak the opportunity to return from exile, and the two reminisce about their past together in the Obsidian Order.

Back on DS9, the senior staff view Tain's message laying out the Obsidian Order and the Tal Shiar's plans to cripple the Dominion. Vice Admiral Toddman admits that while the Federation doesn't condone the plan, they don't intend to stop it either and must simply hope they are successful but plan for the worst: he orders DS9 on full alert and the Defiant and its crew to remain at the station for its protection. Commander Sisko, refusing to abandon his crewmate, launches an unsanctioned mission to take the Defiant into the Gamma Quadrant to rescue Odo.

Tain instructs Garak to interrogate Odo for information about the Founders, using a device that inhibits his ability to shape-shift. Knowing that Tain will never trust him if he refuses, Garak reluctantly does so. As the device causes Odo obvious pain, Garak begs him to reveal anything of use, even if it is a lie. Odo confesses his desire to return to his fellow Changelings, and Garak deactivates the device.

When the fleet arrives at the Founders' homeworld, they find little resistance and open fire, but soon realize that the planet is abandoned, and the mission was a trap. Suddenly, Dominion ships appear and engage the fleet, vastly outnumbering them. In the resulting battle, the Cardassian–Romulan fleet is annihilated.

Knowing that the battle is lost, Garak leaves the bridge of his ship to rescue Odo. They encounter Lovok, who reveals himself to be a Founder and assists Odo in escaping. He confesses that the Founders viewed the Tal Shiar and Obsidian Order as threats and helped push Tain's plan forward in order to destroy them, meaning the only threats left are the Federation and the Klingons. He invites Odo to return to the Founders, but Odo declines. 

Garak attempts to save Tain, but Tain refuses to leave, and Garak refuses to abandon him, so Odo knocks Garak unconscious and escapes with him on the runabout. Trying to escape the crossfire, they are badly damaged and fearing the end, Garak asks Odo for forgiveness. The Defiant then rescues them from the battle.

Back on Deep Space Nine, Toddman confirms there are no signs of other survivors from the attack, and subtly commends Sisko by deciding not to court-martial him. Garak sits mournfully in the wreckage of his shop. Odo arrives and invites Garak to join him for breakfast.

Arc significance
This episode is a pivotal moment in the timeline of Deep Space Nine, one which would define the plotline for the remainder of the series. After several episodes in the second and third seasons establishing the Dominion as a threat, beginning with "The Jem'Hadar", the events of this episode make the eventual war between the Dominion and the Alpha Quadrant inevitable.  The repercussions of the events depicted in this episode resonate throughout the remainder of the series, as the destruction of the Obsidian Order fleet leads to the crippling of the Obsidian Order, a war between the Cardassians and Klingons, and the eventual absorption of Cardassia into the Dominion, which precipitates the beginning of the war between the Dominion and the United Federation of Planets, which occupies the final two seasons of Deep Space Nine.

This event was also implied earlier in the season in "Defiant" with hints that the Obsidian Order were secretly constructing ships.

Reception 
The A.V. Club in their review in 2012, found the episode "great stuff, thrilling and shocking", elaborating that it was "bold storytelling which makes for great drama."

In 2015, Geek.com recommended this episode as "essential watching" for their abbreviated Star Trek: Deep Space Nine binge-watching guide, pairing it with the previous episode "Improbable Cause".

In 2018, CBR rated "Improbable Cause" coupled with "The Die Is Cast", as the 12th best multi episode story arc of Star Trek. They call it a "fun showcase for Garak", the space station's tailor.

In 2018, reviewed as a pair with the preceding episode "Improbable Cause", "The Die Is Cast" was ranked as the 6th best episode of Star Trek: Deep Space Nine by Vulture.

Releases 
The episode was released on VHS, paired with "Explorers".

This episode was released on LaserDisc in Japan on October 2, 1998, in the half-season collection 3rd Season Vol. 2.  The set included episodes from "Destiny" to "The Adversary" on double sided 12 inch optical discs; the box set had total runtime of 552 minutes and included audio tracks in English and Japanese.

The episode was released on June 3, 2003 in North America as part of the season 3 DVD box set. This episode was released in 2017 on DVD with the complete series box set, which had 176 episodes on 48 discs.

References

External links

Star Trek: Deep Space Nine (season 3) episodes
1995 American television episodes
Television episodes written by Ronald D. Moore
Television episodes directed by David Livingston